Lamgong Gewog (Dzongkha: ལམ་གོང་) is a gewog (village block) of Paro District, Bhutan. The gewog had an area of 48.8 square kilometres in 2002, and contained eight villages and 348 households.

References 

Gewogs of Bhutan
Paro District